The Uznach–Wattwil railway, also called the Rickenbahn (Ricken Railway) is a single-track standard-gauge line in Switzerland. It was opened on 1 October 1910 by the Swiss Federal Railways. It is 14.37 kilometres long, including 8,603 kilometres in the Ricken Tunnel.

History
The construction of this line is directly related to the construction of the Bodensee–Toggenburg railway by the Bodensee-Toggenburg-Bahn. Its line included the St. Gallen–Wattwil section of the St. Gallen–Wattwil–Rapperswil project, which was promoted by the engineer "Lusser" and for which a concession was granted on 27 June 1890. As a result of the skilful tactics of the canton of St. Gallen, construction of the line was transferred to the Toggenburgerbahn, the builder of the Wil–Ebnat-Kappel railway. However, it did not have to start construction, as its nationalisation was imminent and it was taken over by the United Swiss Railways (Vereinigte Schweizerbahnen; VSB). As a result, the new Swiss Federal Railways (SBB) was obliged to build the Ricken Railway at its own expense. Construction of the Ricken Tunnel began in January 1904 and the line was put into operation on 1 October 1910. After a railway accident in the Ricken Tunnel on 4 October 1926, in which 9 people died, the immediate electrification of the line was approved. Electric operations at 15 kV AC 16.7 Hz commenced between Rapperswil and Wattwil on 7 May 1927.

Route 

It then climbs to the east to Kaltbrunn station. After that, it continues to ascend to the northeast to the south portal of the Ricken Tunnel. This tunnel is laid out in a straight line with an even gradient of 1.575%. From the north portal, the line drops to Wattwil station. There is connection to the Wil–Ebnat-Kappel railway, which was opened on 14 June 1870 and to the Bodensee–Toggenburg railway to St. Gallen, which was opened on 3 October 1910. The only major structure that had to be built was the 8603 metre-long Ricken Tunnel. The track was built with one track and has remained unchanged to this day.

References

Footnotes

Sources
 
 
 
 
 

Railway lines in Switzerland
Railway lines opened in 1910
1910 establishments in Switzerland